Mount Ratliff is a mountain, 2,520 m, located north of Watson Escarpment and 8 nautical miles (15 km) north-northeast of Mount Doumani. Mapped by United States Geological Survey (USGS) from ground surveys and U.S. Navy air photos, 1960–63. Named by Advisory Committee on Antarctic Names (US-ACAN) for Charles E. Ratliff, aviation machinist mate with U.S. Navy Squadron VX-6 in several Operation Deep Freeze deployments, 1963–67.

See also
Mount O'Neil

Mountains of Marie Byrd Land